Paolo Corsini (born 9 December 1947) is an Italian politician and university professor, former Mayor of Brescia from 1992 to 1994 and from 1998 to 2008.

Biography 
After graduating in Classic Letters, Corsini taught Modern History at the University of Parma.

Corsini joined the Democratic Party of the Left in 1991 and the following year he was elected Mayor of Brescia, holding the office until 1994. From 1994 to 1996, Corsini was Deputy Mayor of Brescia under the guidance of Mino Martinazzoli.

At the 1996 general election, Corsini was elected in the Chamber of Deputies. He leaves the office in 1999 after having been elected again Mayor of Brescia the previous year, being re-elected in 2003. He held his mayoral seat until 2008 when he was re-elected with the Democratic Party in the Chamber of Deputies, after the 2008 election.

At the 2013 election, Corsini was elected in the Senate, holding the seat till the end of the legislature in 2018, after he decided not to run again for a seat in Parliament.

In 2017, Corsini left the Democratic Party and joined the Democratic and Progressive Movement. He retired from active politics in 2019.

Electoral history

First-past-the-post elections

References

External links 
Files about his parliamentary activities (in Italian): XIII, XVI, XVII legislature

1947 births
Living people
Democratic Party of the Left politicians
Democrats of the Left politicians
Democratic Party (Italy) politicians
20th-century Italian politicians
21st-century Italian politicians
Mayors of Brescia
Academic staff of the University of Parma
Deputies of Legislature XIII of Italy
Deputies of Legislature XVI of Italy
Senators of Legislature XVII of Italy